Tethya leysae is a species of sea sponge belonging to the family Tethyidae, found in the Canadian north-west Pacific.

It was first described by Heim and Nickel in 2010,   from specimens collected by Sally P. Leys from a rocky bottom substrate  (10 m-25 m in depth) near Ohiat Island, British Columbia in 2003 and 2006. The species epithet honours Sally P. Leys.

References 

Hadromerida
Animals described in 2010